Antarvedi is famous for its unique temple known as Neelakanteswara temple. The presiding deities of this temple are Shiva and Parvati  who is also known Neelakanta. Puranas indicate that Brahma has worshipped the idol of Lord Shiva at this temple and thus this temple is one of the most important Shiva temple in India. The temple is one of the ancient temples of India with devotees thronging to this place during Shiva Ratri Festival. Antarvedi is located in Konaseema district in Andhra Pradesh.

Antarvedi, in terms of geographical surface area, covers about 4 square miles (6.4 km). The village contains the widely revered Neelakanteswara temple, located opposite Vasishta Godavari, and it is said that Antarvedi is "the second Varanasi by the grace of the Lord." A launch pad allows visitors to land on the small island at the other side of the Godavari River - from this point, travel can then be undertaken to where the river discharges into the ocean.

See also 
{
  "type": "FeatureCollection",
  "features": [
    {
      "type": "Feature",
      "properties": {},
      "geometry": {
        "type": "Point",
        "coordinates": [
          81.41693115234376,
          16.407105212877628
        ]
      }
    }
  ]
}
 Antarvedi
 Lord Lakshmi Narasimha Temple

External links 
 Neelakanteshwara Temple
 Lakshmi Narasimha Temple, Antarvedi

Shiva temples in Andhra Pradesh
Hindu temples in East Godavari district